McCartney 3,2,1 is a 2021 American documentary miniseries starring British musician Paul McCartney and producer Rick Rubin. The six-part series features the  pair discussing McCartney's career, from the Beatles and Wings to his time as a solo artist. It was digitally released by Hulu on July 16, 2021.

Premise 
The series features a sit-down between Paul McCartney and music producer Rick Rubin, as the pair discuss McCartney's early life, work with the Beatles, Wings, and his 50 years as a solo artist. The series also covers the songwriting, influences, and personal relationships that formed McCartney's songs.

Episodes

Release 
The series was announced on May 17, 2021, and digitally released via Hulu on July 16, 2021. The trailer was released a week before the series' debut, on July 9. Internationally, the series premiered on Disney+ on August 25, 2021.

Reception

Critical response 
Review aggregator Rotten Tomatoes reported an approval rating of 97% based on 33 reviews, with an average rating of 8.7/10. The website's critics consensus reads, "Casual listeners' mileage may vary, but audiophiles and Beatles devotees will love seeing Sir Paul McCartney and producer Rick Rubin come together to talk shop." Metacritic gave the series a weighted average score of 85 out of 100 based on 14 critic reviews, indicating "universal acclaim".

Steve Green of IndieWire gave the film a grade of "A−" and wrote: "There's an electricity in the music itself, paired with Rubin and McCartney's parallel reactions to discoveries buried deep in these song mixes, that the show almost doesn't need that added visual momentum. But Heinzerling has a deft touch for when and where to augment the proceedings with an extra light show or to turn McCartney himself into a dolly track pivot point." Writing for Variety, Chris Willman said: "McCartney 3, 2, 1 is such an unerring delight that it sets a very high bar for Beatlemania satiation this year. Not because it's that artfully created or brilliantly hosted, but maybe because it doesn't aspire to impress anyone with anything except how effortlessly it prompts the most talented musician of the last century to empty out a good portion of his brainpan for public perusal." Stuart Jeffries of The Guardian rated the documentary 4 out of 5 stars, writing, "This bounteous feast for Beatles fans sees Paul McCartney dive into the back catalogue with producer Rick Rubin – who then does something truly amazing." Martin Brown of Common Sense Media rated the miniseries 3 out of 5 stars, praised the depiction of positive messages and role models, citing creativity, thoughtfulness, and compassion.

Accolades

References

External links
 

English-language television shows
Documentary television series about music
Television programmes about the Beatles
2020s American documentary television series
Hulu original programming
2021 American television series debuts
2021 American television series endings
Paul McCartney